"Jump Around" is a song by American hip hop group House of Pain, produced by DJ Muggs of the hip hop group Cypress Hill, who has also covered the song. It became a hit in 1992, reaching number 3 in the United States. A 1993 re-release of the song in the United Kingdom, where the initial release had been a minor hit, peaked at number 8. "Jump Around" was featured at position 580 on Q Magazines 1001 Best Songs Ever, number 24 on VH1's 100 Greatest Songs of the 90s, number 66 on VH1's 100 Greatest Songs of Hip Hop, number 325 on Blenders 500 Greatest Songs Since You Were Born and number 47 on NMEs 100 Best Songs Of The 1990s. The song is popular among dancehall DJs and is widely regarded in the United Kingdom as a club classic.

Development
DJ Muggs has stated that he originally produced the beat for Cypress Hill, but rapper B-Real did not want to record at that time. It was subsequently offered to Ice Cube, who refused it, before finally being taken and used by House of Pain.

Samples
The song features a distinctive horn fanfare intro, sampled from Bob & Earl's 1963 track "Harlem Shuffle". The song also samples "Popeye the Hitchhiker" by Chubby Checker, but it is best known for a high-pitched squealing sound that appears at the beginning of almost every bar—66 times in the course of the recording.

The origin of the squeal has been the subject of debate. American blogger Anil Dash and musician Questlove of hip-hop band The Roots have insisted on Prince's "Gett Off" as the source. A Newsweek reader performed a spectrogram analysis, which revealed that the sample more closely matches Junior Walker and the All Stars' "Shoot Your Shot", and House of Pain member Everlast himself told Questlove that it is a horn making the squeal and not Prince; he later claimed the sample was from Divine Styler's "Ain't Sayin' Nothin", which samples "Shoot Your Shot". However, Anil Dash claims the band has denied that the sample is Prince to avoid paying royalties to the singer. An identical squeal can also be heard throughout the track "Gotta be a Leader," released two years earlier by the group Guy. For his part, DJ Muggs says the sample came from neither Prince nor Junior Walker.

Critical reception
About.com's Bill Lamb said that "after one time of hearing this riveting blend of rap and rock, you will likely never forget the sampled saxophone squeal from Jr. Walker and the All Stars that leads off every bar." He also wrote that "for a brief period of time in the 1990s, it seemed that the marriage of edgy rock and hip-hop could actually become a thing. 'Jump Around' is proof that the union could either be incredibly infectious or annoying, depending on one's tolerance for the incessant siren that accompanies the pounding beats." AllMusic editor Rob Theakston described the song as a "dynamite classic". He also added that the "anthem" that got the Irish boys rolling in the first place "still sounds as timeless and energetic nearly a decade along". J.D. Considine for Schenectady, New York's The Daily Gazette noted it as "springy" in his review, and Scott Sterling from The Michigan Daily called it the "most happening track" on the House of Pain album. Bill Wyman from Entertainment Weekly said, "It’s a charging dance number based on a sampled snatch of bagpipe." Another editor, Leah Greenblatt wrote that "the first and only members of hip-hop's Irish-American Thug Life Hall of Fame earned their spot in that (imaginary) pantheon with this killer blast of rapid-fire rap bravado." Brian A. Samson from the Gavin Report commented that "this uptempo single provides listeners with what H.O.P. calls "fine malt lyrics." Laced with squeaky buzzes that sounds like of a clarinet played by a novice, the beats should provide for some head-noddin' action."

Across the Atlantic, Dublin-based Evening Herald called it a "compelling single." The Irish Independent said that with it, the group "made a fairly groovy record." Music Week'''s RM Dance Update stated that it is an "excellent debut", adding, "built on a chugging Caribbean rhythm, 'Jump Around' features a strong Heavy D-like rap and its popularity is ensured by a chanted chorus with the buzz word 'Jump'. With a sleeve festooned with shamrock leaves and an Irish flag, it seems Tommy Boy may have beaten Talkin' Loud in the race to give us Irish rap." Editor Andy Beevers called it "an infectious bouncy track", adding that lyrically, "their invitation to jump is as aggressive as Kris Kross's was cute." NME described the song as "irresistible, the ultimate easy floorfiller, and floor-destroyer." Rupert Howe from Select magazine described it as a "Kris-Kross-with testosterone smash" and added that it is "an impossibly simple freestyle skank that stormed the US billboard big-time."

Chart performance
In the United States, "Jump Around" peaked at number 3 on the Billboard Hot 100, while reaching number 5 on the Billboard Hot Rap Songs and number 17 on the Billboard Billboard Dance Club Songs. In Canada, the single hit number 7 on the RPM Dance/Urban Chart and number 45 on the RPM Singles Chart. In Europe, it managed to climb into the Top 10 in Ireland, the Netherlands and the United Kingdom. In the latter, "Jump Around" peaked at number 8 in its second run on the UK Singles Chart, on May 23, 1993. Additionally, it was a Top 30 hit in Belgium and Sweden, as well as on the Eurochart Hot 100, where it hit number 30 in June 1993. In Oceania, the single peaked at number 15 in Australia and number 31 in New Zealand. It earned a gold record in Australia and the UK, with a sale of 35,000 and 400,000 singles. In the US, it earned a platinum record, when 1 million units were sold there.

Music video
The music video for "Jump Around" was filmed during the 1992 New York City Saint Patrick's Day parade. Portions were shot on the parade route as well as in Central Park and Old Town Bar and Restaurant. New York Yankees super fan and Yankee Stadium regular Freddy Schuman can be seen in the parade crowd, ringing his signature shamrock pan near the end of the video. The video ends with a dedication to the memory of Matt Champy, a friend of the band who died in 1992.

Track listings
 "Jump Around" (Master mix) – 3:37
 "Jump Around" (DJ Bizznizz remix) – 4:06
 "Jump Around" (Pete Rock remix) – 3:56
 "House of Pain Anthem" (Master mix) – 2:35

Charts

Weekly charts

Year-end charts

Certifications

Release history

Cover versions
In 2013, Everlast released a cover of the song, as "Jump Around?". It was released on the EP The Life Acoustic.''

On September 16, 2016, British YouTuber and rapper KSI released his own version of "Jump Around", featuring American rapper Waka Flocka Flame.

In 2019, American nu metal band Coming for Blood released a cover version of "Jump Around", featuring former House of Pain and current Limp Bizkit member DJ Lethal on turntables.

Use in sports

At home football games at the University of Wisconsin–Madison, students "Jump Around" to the song between the third and fourth quarters. The tradition grew out of the men's varsity swim team members, in 1992, playing it over a portable CD player and broadcasting via a smuggled-in megaphone to sections O and P during the games to rile up those sections. In March 1997, at a Fraternity party at Delta Tau Delta at midnight the song was played with the football team and members of the future stadium employees and it became the midnight anthem for every party until the end of that year. The "unofficial" start was on Saturday, October 10, 1998, at the Badgers Homecoming game against the Purdue Boilermakers. After no offensive points were scored in the third quarter, and en route to their second 6–0 start of the modern football era, one of the Badgers' marketing agents, who was in charge of sound, piped the song through the loudspeakers. It stirred up fans and players and eventually became a tradition.

However, on September 6, 2003 (the Badgers' first home game of the season), with construction of skyboxes surrounding Camp Randall Stadium, UW officials decided to cancel the "Jump Around" due to worries about structural integrity. Stadium security and the local police department had been informed of this decision but no notification had been given to the fans. When news surfaced on Monday, September 8, that this event was not a technical or human malfunction, but rather a decision by campus officials, the students launched a protest. Petitions circulated and students pushed back against administration. Structural engineers confirmed that the stadium would suffer no structural damage caused by the vibrations created by jumping. Two days later, Chancellor John D. Wiley announced that the "Jump Around" tradition would resume. The song's title is displayed on unofficial Wisconsin Badgers clothing and apparel, along with the credit/debit cards of the university's employee/student/alumni credit union.

Professional wrestlers J. C. Ice and Wolfie D, collectively known as PG-13, used a censored version of the song as their entrance to the rings.

The Detroit Tigers use this song when they hit a home run. Brian Wilson also used it as his entrance song in 2010 while he was relief pitcher for the San Francisco Giants.

Whenever the Rally Monkey, the unofficial mascot of the Los Angeles Angels makes an appearance on the Angel Stadium videoboard, she would be seen holding a sign saying that it's 'RALLY TIME!" while the song plays.

The Vegas Golden Knights use this song as the teams return to the ice for the 3rd period.

References

External links

House of Pain songs
1992 debut singles
1992 songs
Music Week number-one dance singles
Song recordings produced by DJ Muggs
Tommy Boy Records singles
Wisconsin Badgers football
XL Recordings singles